Thee Heavenly Music Association was formed by Multi Platinum Producer and Engineer, Dave Hillis and Helen Storer.  (noted for her high-profile role in London all girl punk band Fluffy) Storer is also known for performing live shows with Fireball Ministry and Duff McKagen's solo band Loaded. She is also a contributing vocalist on the Twilight Singers album, She Loves You, with Mark Lanegan and Greg Dulli.

Hillis, who is best known for engineering Pearl Jam’s multi- platinum Ten LP,  Temple of the Dog, Alice in Chains' Would? and Sap EPs, as well as songs on Cameron Crowe’s Singles soundtrack and a Dennis Leary HBO Special,  recorded and engineered the project, later becoming an integral part of the band himself. Hillis is also a respected recording artist and had a recording contract with Island Records for his band Sybil Vane. He engineered The Afghan Whigs farewell record 1965 and also co-produced the record's single "66".

Musicians used for the heavily Psychedelic based album Shaping the Invisible, included bassist Bardi Martin from Candlebox and drummer Dave Krusen from Pearl Jam. Shaping the Invisible is the band's first album and its title is taken from a quote by Leonardo da Vinci describing music. The album was released to rave reviews on Rehash Records, and a single was released on Fierce Panda

Discography

Albums
Shaping the Invisible (2004) - Rehash Records

Compilations
 SHOCK & OAR 2005 Fierce Panda Records

References

External links 
 Aidabet
 Pop Matters
 GirlBand.Org

2001 establishments in California
Musical groups established in 2001
American musical trios
American noise rock music groups
Musical groups from Los Angeles
Psychedelic rock music groups from California
American shoegaze musical groups
Indie rock musical groups from California
Fierce Panda Records artists